Porotergus is a genus of ghost knifefishes found in the Amazon and Essequibo basins in tropical South America. They are found over sandy bottoms in shallow (P. gymnotus) or deep rivers (two remaining). They feed on small aquatic insect larvae.

Species
There are currently three described species in this genus:

 Porotergus duende de Santana & Crampton, 2010
 Porotergus gimbeli, named for Jacob Gimbel, who financed the expedition on which it was discovered. M. M. Ellis, 1912
 Porotergus gymnotus M. M. Ellis, 1912

UCLA flag pole
The base of UCLA's central flag pole, a gift to the University from Jacob Gimbel, features a brass plaque depicting P. gimbeli.

References

Apteronotidae
Fish of South America
Freshwater fish genera
Taxa named by Max Mapes Ellis